VBV De Graafschap is a professional football club from Doetinchem, Netherlands, playing in the Eerste Divisie, the second tier of Dutch football.

It was formed on 1 February 1954 and they play their home games at the De Vijverberg stadium. The stadium was opened on 12 August 2000 and stands on the site of the club's old pitch. The club name is Dutch for "The County". They are nicknamed Superboeren ("Super Farmers").

While not a large club by European club football standards, the club has remained a semi-permanent fixture in the Eredivisie (top league); although to date it has never won any silverware of importance. It also has a large stadium and a large fan base when compared to many other Dutch teams, particularly those in the Eerste Divisie. They had a fierce rivalry with Vitesse Arnhem, but during the years due several circumstances Go Ahead Eagles began to be a rival as well.

The club's colors are blue and white hooped shirts with white shorts and blue socks.

De Graafschap's home base, De Vijverberg has been voted as the most atmospheric stadium in the Eredivisie for the 2018–19 campaign.

History
De Graafschap had their longest streak in the Dutch top tier from 1995 until 2003. In the 1995–96 season De Graafschap finished in 8th place, an all-time high. After this season results went down and in 2003 the club was relegated after finishing in last place (18th).

Since 2003, De Graafschap was relegated four times and gained promotion five times. They were crowned champions of the Eerste Divisie in 2007 and 2010, and won the promotion playoffs in 2004 and 2015. De Graafschap never finished last in the Eredivisie since 2003 but lost relegation playoffs after finishing in 17th place in 2005, 2009 and 2012. In the 2015-16 Eredivisie season De Graafschap were once again relegated through playoffs after finishing 17th but not before drawing 1–1 against AFC Ajax on the final day of the season, denying Ajax the championship. In 2018, the club gained promotion again by winning the promotion playoffs, beating Almere City FC in the playoffs finals. They were relegated in 2019, and the next season ended in further heartbreak on April 24, 2020 as they were denied a possible promotion back to the top flight due to the COVID-19 pandemic forcing the Eredivisie to declare their season void with no promotion or relegation.

Late in the 2020–21 season, De Graafschap were in control of their promotion hopes, only needing one win in their final two games to secure promotion. However, they were held to a 1-1 draw, followed by a goalless draw versus Helmond Sport, denying them an automatic promotion spot and forcing them to go through the promotion playoffs. De Graafschap crashed out of the playoffs in the first round after a 3-2 home loss to Roda JC, thus meaning that they would remain in the Eerste Divisie.

Honours
 Eerste Divisie
 Winner: 1991, 2007, 2010
 Tweede Divisie
 Winner: 1969
 Promoted to Eredivisie
 Promotion: 1973, 1981, 1995, 2004, 2015, 2018
 Promoted to Eerste Divisie
 Promotion: 1966

Results
Below is a table with De Graafschap's domestic results since the introduction of the Eredivisie in 1956.

Players

Current squad

Out on loan

Notable former players

The players below had senior international cap(s) for their respective countries. Players whose name is listed represented their countries while playing for De Graafschap.

 Jason Čulina
 Mamadou Zongo
 Will Johnson
 Yannick Salem
 Zico Tumba
 Hans Aabech
 Lasse Schöne
 Hazem Emam
 Jussi Kujala
 Niklas Tarvajärvi
 Ville Väisänen
 Ali Ibrahim Pelé
 Loïc Loval
 Arnar Viðarsson
 Jhon van Beukering
 Ben Sahar
 Gil Vermouth
 Ģirts Karlsons
 Dulee Johnson
 Xhelil Abdulla
 Bakary Diakité
 Oussama Assaidi
 Youssef El Jebli
 Ernie Brandts
 John van den Brom
 Jean-Paul van Gastel
 Klaas-Jan Huntelaar
 Luuk de Jong
 Jurrie Koolhof
 Kees Krijgh
 Martijn Meerdink
 Peter van Vossen
 Dick Schoenaker
 Sonny Silooy
 Erik ten Hag
 Hans Kraay Jr.
 Wasiu Taiwo
 Tomasz Rząsa
 Stephan Keller

Coaching staff

Former coaches

 Leendert IJssennagger (1954–55)
 Heinz Huber (1955)
 Jan Poulus (1955–59)
 Wim Engel (1959)
 Eric Jones (1960–62)
 Evert Teunissen (1962–67)
 Ad Zonderland (1967–71)
 Bert van Lingen (1971)
 Piet de Visser (1971–74)
 Evert Teunissen (1974–76)
 Ben Polak (interim) (1976)
 Hans Dorjee (1976–77)
 Henk Ellens (1977–78)
 Pim van de Meent (1978–80)
 Huib Ruijgrok (1980–83)
 Sandor Popovics (1983–85)
 Henk van Brussel (1985–87)
 Pim Verbeek (1987–89)
 Ben Zweers (1989)
 Simon Kistemaker (1989–93)
 Jan Versleijen (1993–94)
 Frans Körver (1994–95)
 Hans van Doorneveld (1995)
 Fritz Korbach (1995–98)
 Frans Thijssen (1999)
 Rob McDonald (1999–00)
 Jurrie Koolhof (interim) (2000)
 Gerard Marsman (2000–01)
 Jurrie Koolhof (2001–02)
 Peter Bosz (2002–03)
 Frans Adelaar (2003–04)
 Gert Kruys (2004–05)
 Andries Ulderink (interim) (2005)
 Jan de Jonge (2005–08)
 Henk van Stee (2008–09)
 Darije Kalezić (2009–11)
 Andries Ulderink (2011–12)
 Richard Roelofsen (interim) (2012)
 Pieter Huistra (2012–13)
 Jan Vreman (interim) (2013–14)
 Jimmy Calderwood (2014)
 Jan Vreman (2014–16)
 Henk de Jong (2017–2019)
 Mike Snoei (2019–now)

See also
Dutch football league teams

References

External links

  
 Fansite Superboeren 

 
Football clubs in the Netherlands
Football clubs in Doetinchem
Association football clubs established in 1954
1954 establishments in the Netherlands